The 1954 United States Senate election in Virginia was held on November 2, 1954. Democratic incumbent Senator Absalom Willis Robertson defeated Independent Democrat Charles Lewis and Social Democrat Clarke Robb and was re-elected to a second term in office.

Results

See also 
 United States Senate elections, 1954

References

Virginia
1954
1954 Virginia elections